Willem ("Wim") van de Schilde (born 4 November 1948 in The Hague, South Holland) is a former water polo player from The Netherlands, who finished in seventh position with the Dutch Men's Water Polo Team at the 1972 Summer Olympics in Munich.

See also
 Netherlands men's Olympic water polo team records and statistics
 List of men's Olympic water polo tournament goalkeepers

References
 Dutch Olympic Committee

External links
 

1948 births
Living people
Sportspeople from The Hague
Dutch male water polo players
Water polo goalkeepers
Olympic water polo players of the Netherlands
Water polo players at the 1972 Summer Olympics
20th-century Dutch people